The Boston Public Health Commission, the oldest health department in the United States, is an independent public agency providing a wide range of health services and programs. It is governed by a seven-member board of health appointed by the Mayor of Boston. Its mission is to  "protect, preserve, and promote the health and well-being of all Boston residents, particularly those who are most vulnerable." The commission is headquartered at 1010 Massachusetts Avenue in Boston.

History
In 1799, The Boston Board of Health was established to combat any potential cholera outbreaks. Paul Revere was Boston's first health commissioner.

In 1864 the Boston City Hospital opened, managed by the board.

The Boston Public Health Act of 1995 caused the organization of the current commission.  In 1996, the modern Boston Public Health Commission opened after the Boston City Hospital (founded 1864) and Boston University Hospital (founded 1855) were merged into the Boston Medical Center. This was the first full merger in the United States of a public hospital with a private academic medical center and its hospital.

Organization

The Boston Public Health Commission is formed up of six different bureaus:
 Child, Adolescent, and Family Health
 Community Initiatives
 Emergency Medical Services & Public Health Preparedness
 Homeless Services
 Infectious Disease
 Recovery Services

In total there are forty different programs, including Boston' Emergency Medical Services and Homeless Shelters.
Boston Board of Health
Could inspect stores, vessels, factories, and houses for health hazards.
Had the power to levy fines and require the offender to remove a hazard at his own expense.
Safety of workers generally considered to be their own responsibility, not that of the employer.
Insurance carriers covered property, not people.

Tobacco Regulation

In 2008, the BPHC banned the sale of "blunt wraps," tobacco-leaf papers that are used to make marijuana cigarettes, in Boston. In April 2009 a Massachusetts judge upheld the ban.

References

External links
 Boston Public Health Commission on Facebook
 Boston Public Health Commission on YouTube
 Boston Public Health Commission on Twitter
 Boston Public Health Commission
 Boston Public Health Commission - City of Boston

Government of Boston
1799 establishments in Massachusetts